The Loxton North Football Club are an Australian rules football club which compete in the Riverland Football League. The club was formed in 1954 and competed in the Upper Murray "B" grade competition. In 1964 the club was promoted to A grade.

Premierships
1979, 1997, 1998, 1999, 2000, 2004, 2011, 2013, 2015

Books
 The encyclopedia of South Australian Country Football Clubs.  Peter Lines

References

External links
 Official AFL Website
 RFL League Website

Australian rules football clubs established in 1954
1954 establishments in Australia
Australian rules football clubs in South Australia